The Maurice A. Deane School of Law at Hofstra University (commonly known as Hofstra Law) is a law school located in Hempstead, New York on Long Island, affiliated with Hofstra University. Founded in 1970 and accredited by the ABA in 1971, the school offers a JD, a joint JD/MBA degree, and LL.M degrees in American Law (for foreign law graduates) and Family law. It also offers online LL.M and MA degrees in Health Law & Policy, an online LL.M in American Law, and an online M.A. in American Legal Studies. The Law School is on the southern portion of the  Hofstra University campus, in Hempstead, New York. The school was renamed to the Maurice A. Deane School of Law at Hofstra University in September 2011.

Academics 

Hofstra Law offers Juris Doctor concentrations in eight areas of study: Alternative Dispute Resolution, Business Law, Corporate Compliance, Criminal Law and Procedure, Family Law, Health Law, Intellectual Property Law, and International Law.

Rankings
In the 2021 U.S. News & World Report rankings for law schools, Hofstra Law ranked 119th nationally. In 2011, the school was named one of the country's best public interest law schools by preLaw magazine, a national publication aimed at prospective law students. Among the 75 law schools that made the list, Hofstra ranked 11th.

Hofstra Law was ranked the No. 54 school in the country in placing partners in U.S. offices of the 100 largest national law firms in a 2011 study by Theodore P. Seto.  According to a 2016 study, by Law School Transparency, Hofstra ranked 35th nationally for employment outcomes and 6th in New York State.

Admission statistics
For the 2019 entering class, 48.33% of applicants were accepted with 18.90% enrolling, the 50th Percentile of enrolled students having a 154 LSAT score and a 3.53 GPA.

Facilities

Hofstra Law is housed in the original building opened in the 1970s upon the school's inception, although it has undergone several extensive renovations since that time.  The lower floors of Kushner Hall are home to the law school's two level Barbara and Maurice A. Deane Law Library. The law building also contains both an appellate Moot Courtroom and trial moot courtroom. Access to wireless internet can be found throughout the campus.

In the early 1990s, the school added a new building, Joan Axinn Hall, to house its growing clinical programs and the Office of Career Services, and it expanded into neighboring Roosevelt Hall in 2006, with new space for its five student-run journals and other student organizations.

In total, the law school operates out of 4 buildings: Koppleman Hall (classrooms, offices, and courtrooms), Kushner Hall (library, atrium, and offices), Joan Axinn Hall (admissions and clinics), and Roosevelt Hall (offices for each journal and the moot court).

Faculty

As of 2019, Hofstra Law had 40 full-time faculty members. The faculty included (or had included in the past) Nora Demleitner (past member), Alafair Burke (no longer practicing), Monroe Freedman (deceased), Robert A. Baruch Bush, Aaron Twerski (past member), and Eric Lane (non-attorney).  Per the 2022 Standard 509 Information Report filed with the ABA, full-time faculty included 23 were men, 27 women and seven people of color. Part-time faculty included 50 men, 27 women and five people of color.

Employment 
According to Hofstra Law's 2018 ABA-required disclosures, 75.95% of the Class of 2017 obtained full-time, long-term, JD-required employment nine months after graduation. Hofstra's Law School Transparency under-employment score is 10.5%, indicating the percentage of the Class of 2017 unemployed, pursuing an additional degree, or working in a non-professional, short-term, or part-time position

For the July 2018 New York bar exam, 62% of Hofstra Law graduates who were first-time exam takers passed the bar, vs. an 83% average for graduates of New York ABA-accredited schools.

Journals

Student Edited 
Hofstra Law Review (Est. 1973)
Hofstra Labor and Employment Law Journal (Est. 1982)
Hofstra Journal of International Business and Law (Est. 1999)

Peer Reviewed 
Family Court ReviewACTEC Law Journal of the American College of Trust and Estate Counsel (ACTEC).

Costs
Annual tuition at Hofstra Law for the 2018–2019 academic year is $59,214. The Law School Transparency estimated debt-financed cost of attendance for three years is $329,392.

Alumni

Government

 Matt Ahearn, served in the New Jersey General Assembly from 2002 to 2004
 Luis R. Sepulveda, Member of the New York State Senate, former Member of the New York State Assembly
 Joseph Borg, the Securities Commissioner of Alabama since 1994
 Ann-Margaret Carrozza, the New York State Assembly from 1997 to 2010
 Joe Ferriero, the Bergen County Democratic Organization Chairman from 1998 to 2009
 Edward P. Mangano, ('87), Nassau County Executive since 2010
 Neil Levin, Executive Director of the Port Authority of New York and New Jersey, killed during the September 11 terrorist attacks on the World Trade Center
 Thomas McKevitt ('96), member of the New York State Assembly since 2006
 David Paterson ('83), former Governor of New York, former Lieutenant Governor and minority leader of the New York State Senate
 Richard Socarides, former White House adviser under President Bill Clinton from 1993 to 1999
 Thomas C. Wales ('79), assassinated federal prosecutor
 David Weprin, member of the New York State Assembly since 2010. former member of New York City Council, former Deputy Superintendent of the New York State Banking Commission, former Chairman of New York's Securities Industry Association
 Jon Bramnick, member and minority leader of the New Jersey General Assembly representing the 21st district since 2003

Judges

 Maryanne Trump Barry ('74), former judge on the U.S. Court of Appeals for the Third Circuit, sister of 45th U.S. President Donald Trump
 John J. Farley III ('73), former judge of the United States Court of Appeals for Veterans Claims
 Sallie Manzanet-Daniels ('88), Associate Justice of the New York Appellate Division of the Supreme Court, First Judicial Department
 Neal Hendel ('76), Justice of the Supreme Court of Israel

Other

Linda Cahn, founder and president of Pharmacy Benefit Consultants
Norm Kent ('71), chairman of the National Organization for the Reform of Marijuana Laws NORML
 Charles Kushner, billionaire real estate developer, and father of Jared Kushner
 Katherine Lapp ('81), executive vice president and chief administrative officer of Harvard University
 Randy Levine ('80), president of the New York Yankees since January 2000
 Mary Matalin, political consultant for the Republican Party, advisor to former President George W. Bush (attended but did not graduate)
 Bobby Muller ('74), peace advocate
 Burton Rocks ('97), sports agent
Joel Segal ('89), sports agent
David D'Amato, subject of the documentary, Tickled''

See also
 Law of New York
 Hofstra University

References

External links
 

Law schools in New York (state)
Law
Educational institutions established in 1970
Hempstead (village), New York
1970 establishments in New York (state)
Law schools in the New York metropolitan area